The Nirvana bootleg recordings are a number of recordings of musical performances by the American rock band Nirvana, which were previously not officially released by the band, or under any other legal authority. The recordings consist of both live performances and outtakes from studio sessions unavailable as a legal release.

Overview
Nirvana was formed by singer/guitarist Kurt Cobain and bassist Krist Novoselic in Aberdeen, Washington, in 1987, and featured drummer Dave Grohl for the majority of the band's career.  They had previously gone through a succession of drummers, most notably Chad Channing, Dale Crover and Dan Peters.  Jason Everman was briefly added as a second guitarist in 1989.  Pat Smear joined the band as a touring guitarist in 1993. Although Nirvana existed for less than a decade, they released three studio albums, starting with 1989's Bleach, followed by their major label breakthrough album, Nevermind in 1991.  In Utero was released in 1993, just seven months prior to Cobain's death in April 1994. Also released in 1992 was Incesticide.

As Nirvana's popularity grew following the success of Nevermind, unreleased recordings of the band began to surface in the form of unofficial bootleg CDs, often originating from companies in Europe and Japan.  The sound quality and album art would frequently range from appalling to appealing, sometimes sounding like and resembling something of a legitimate release. Some of the recordings came from "tape trading" circles while others may have been recorded or obtained specifically for the bootleg CD. Material was sometimes gathered from already existing vinyl bootlegs or other bootleg CDs as they became available. Additionally, songs issued only as a b-side or compilation track became frequent candidates for use as filler material.  Nirvana would not see any royalties from these releases, nor would they have anything to do with their production. The first Nirvana bootleg CD was released in 1992 by Post Script, simply titled Europe 1991. Since then, hundreds of recordings of concerts, demos and various unreleased material have surfaced in this format.

The official release Incesticide was issued in late 1992, including demos, outtakes and radio sessions, some of which were previously circulating in lower quality on bootleg CDs. Despite MTV Unplugged in New York being released less than a year after the performance occurred, it would still become one of the band's most bootlegged shows. After the first several installments of the unofficial Outcesticide collection came through, the official live album From the Muddy Banks of the Wishkah was released in 1996, containing various performances recorded between 1989 and 1994.  It should also be noted that the official With the Lights Out box set was released in 2004, which included many rare, unreleased recordings, while the official Live at Reading debuted Nirvana's now classic 1992 Reading Festival performance in 2009, after years of endless bootlegging.

Due to the fact that there is an uncountable number of unofficial releases and their accompanying versions, below is a partial list of the most sought-after and talked about bootleg CD recordings, including the A Season in Hell Part One box set, the Into the Black box set, and the complete Outcesticide series.  Since bootleg CDs are notorious for including erroneously listed information pertaining to song titles, dates and venues, the information below has omitted any false listings and replaced them with the correct information.

Outcesticide albums
The Outcesticide albums are the most well known Nirvana bootleg CD series in existence and carry a name recognition second only to Nirvana's official releases.  These unofficial compilation albums consisted of live material, demo recordings, television appearances, radio performances and other various unreleased material.  Although Blue Moon Records originally produced the series and manufactured multiple pressings throughout the 1990s, they have been endlessly cloned, with counterfeit versions accounting for the majority of the market.  Other companies to later issue the series included Darkside Records, Red Robin Records and Kobra Records, among others.

Outcesticide: In Memory of Kurt Cobain

All songs written by Kurt Cobain except where noted.

 Tracks 1-7 from an early demo tape recorded at Reciprocal Recording in Seattle on January 23, 1988.  "Spank Thru" remains unreleased.
 Track 8 recorded summer 1988 at Reciprocal Recording in Seattle with songs that appeared on the "Love Buzz" single and later appeared on With the Lights Out.
 Tracks 9-11 recorded on a 4-track at the Cobain residence in Olympia, Washington, in 1988.
 Track 14 from an audience source recorded live at The Duchess of York in Leeds, England, on October 25, 1989.
 Track 15 recorded for Boy Meets Girl on KAOS radio at The Evergreen State College in Olympia, Washington, on September 25, 1990, and later appeared on With the Lights Out.
 Track 16 from the BBC radio session recorded at Maida Vale Studios in London on October 21, 1990. The final mix appeared on Hormoaning.
 Tracks 17-19 recorded at Smart Studios, Madison, Wisconsin, in April 1990. "Pay to Play" appeared on DGC Rarities Volume 1.
 Tracks 20 and 21 recorded for Nozems-a-Gogo on VPRO radio at Jingle Production Room 2 in Hilversum, Netherlands, on November 25, 1991.
 Track 23 from an audience source recorded live at Bloom in Mezzago, Italy, on November 17, 1991.

Outcesticide II: The Needle & the Damage Done
All songs written by Kurt Cobain except where noted.

 Tracks 1 and 16 recorded at Smart Studios in Madison, Wisconsin, in April 1990.  "In Bloom" was later featured on the DVD portion of With the Lights Out.
 Tracks 2 and 18 from an audience source recorded live at Kultur-Basar, Hanau, West Germany on November 18, 1989.
 Track 3 from a soundboard source recorded live at U4, Vienna, Austria on November 22, 1989.
 Track 4 from an audience source recorded live at Bloom in Mezzago, Italy, on November 17, 1991.
 Tracks 5, 8 and 9 recorded live at the Hollywood Rock Festival, Rio de Janeiro, Brazil on January 23, 1993.  "Smells Like Teen Spirit" features Flea on trumpet.
 Track 6 from a soundboard source recorded live at the Cabaret Metro, Chicago, Illinois, on October 12, 1991.
 Track 7 recorded at BMG Ariola Ltda., Studio B, Rio de Janeiro, Brazil on January 21, 1993, and features members of Hole with Cobain on bass.
 Tracks 10-12 from an acoustic in-store performance recorded live at Northern Lights Records, Minneapolis, Minnesota, on October 14, 1991.
 Track 13 from an audience source recorded live at Castaic Lake Amphitheatre, Castaic, California, on September 26, 1992, where Cobain performed solo acoustic.
 Track 14 from an audience source recorded live at Salle Omnisports, Rennes, France, on December 7, 1991, and features vocals by Novoselic and Grohl.
 Track 15 from an audience source recorded live at Vooruit, Ghent, Belgium on November 23, 1991.
 Track 17 from a soundboard source recorded live at Palaghiaccio, Marino, Italy on February 22, 1994.
 Track 19 from a soundboard source recorded during soundcheck at The Palladium, Hollywood, California, on August 17, 1990, with Dale Crover on drums.
 Track 20 from an audience source recorded live at the Salem Armory Auditorium, Salem, Oregon, on December 14, 1993.
 Track 21 recorded for The Word at Limehouse Studios in London on November 8, 1991.

Outcesticide III: The Final Solution

All songs written by Kurt Cobain except where noted.

 Tracks 1-3 recorded for Nulle Part Ailleurs at Canal+ in Paris on February 4, 1994.
 Track 5 from an audience source recorded live at Kultur-Basar in Hanau, West Germany, on November 18, 1989.
 Tracks 6 and 7 recorded summer 1988 at Reciprocal Recording in Seattle with songs that appeared on the "Love Buzz" single.  "Blandest" later appeared on With the Lights Out.
 Tracks 8 and 9 recorded at The Music Source in Seattle on September 1989 and later appeared on With the Lights Out.
 Track 10 recorded live at MTV Studios in New York City on January 10, 1992.
 Tracks 11 and 12 recorded for Tunnel at RAI Centro di Produzione TV Studi Nomentano in Rome on February 23, 1994.  "Dumb" features Melora Creager on cello.
 Tracks 13 and 18 from an audience source recorded live at the Reading Festival in England on August 30, 1992, and later appeared in soundboard form on Live at Reading.
 Tracks 14, 15 and 19 from an audience source recorded live at the Off Ramp Café in Seattle on November 25, 1990.  The majority of the show is available on the first disc of A Season in Hell Part One.
 Tracks 16 and 17 recorded for Nozems-a-Gogo on VPRO radio at Villa 65 in Hilversum, Netherlands, on November 1, 1989.
 Track 20 from an audience source recorded live at Vooruit in Ghent, Belgium, on November 23, 1991.
 Track 21 from an audience source recorded live at Bloom in Mezzago, Italy, on November 26, 1989, where Cobain performed an encore with Tad.
 Track 22 recorded live at the Community World Theatre in Tacoma, Washington, on January 23, 1988, and later appeared on With the Lights Out, this track includes a Led Zeppelin cover called Moby Dick .
 Track 23 recorded on a 4-track at the Cobain residence in Olympia, Washington, in 1988 and later appeared on With the Lights Out.

Outcesticide IV: Rape of the Vaults

All songs written by Kurt Cobain except where noted.

 Track 1 appeared on the Wal-Mart and Kmart versions of In Utero, as well as the album's discontinued third single.
 Track 3 recorded for Tonight with Jonathan Ross at The Greenwood in London on December 6, 1991, and later appeared in part on Live! Tonight! Sold Out!!.
 Track 4 recorded for Top of the Pops at BBC Elstree Centre in Hertfordshire, England, on November 28, 1991, and appeared on Live! Tonight! Sold Out!!.
 Track 5 from a soundboard source recorded live at the Teatro Castello in Rome on November 19, 1991.
 Tracks 6 and 10 from a soundboard source recorded live at Duffy's Tavern in Lincoln, Nebraska, on May 13, 1990.
 Tracks 7-9 from a soundboard source recorded live at Bogart's in Long Beach, California, on February 16, 1990, taken from the 7-inch vinyl bootleg Penu Baby.
 Track 11 from an audience source recorded live at the Reading Festival in England on August 30, 1992, and later appeared in soundboard form on Live at Reading.
 Track 12 recorded on a 4-track at the Melvins practice space in San Francisco in April 1991 with Dale Crover on drums and Grohl on bass.  The track later appeared without the intro on With the Lights Out.
 Track 13 recorded on a 4-track at the Cobain residence in Olympia, Washington, in 1988 and later appeared on With the Lights Out.
 Track 14 recorded in the television studio of The Evergreen State College in Olympia, Washington, on March 20, 1990.
 Track 15 recorded summer 1988 at Reciprocal Recording in Seattle, Washington, with songs that appeared on the "Love Buzz" single.
 Track 16 from an audience source recorded live at Rock City in Nottingham, England, on December 3, 1991, taken from the 12-inch vinyl bootleg Entertain Us.
 Tracks 17 and 18 from an audience source recorded live at Salle Omnisports in Rennes, France, on February 16, 1994.
 Tracks 19-23 recorded on a 4-track at the Cobain residence, Olympia, Washington, in 1987.  "Clean Up Before She Comes" later appeared on With the Lights Out.

Outcesticide V: Disintegration

All songs written by Kurt Cobain except where noted.

 Track 1 is a Hole song with prominent vocal contributions from Cobain, which were mixed down before it appeared on Live Through This.
 Track 2 recorded for Nozems-a-Gogo on VPRO radio at Villa 65 in Hilversum, Netherlands, on November 1, 1989.
 Track 3 from a soundboard source recorded during soundcheck at The Palladium in Hollywood, California, on August 17, 1990, with Dale Crover on drums.
 Tracks 4 and 5 from a soundboard source recorded live at Palau Municipal dels Esports in Barcelona, Spain, on February 9, 1994, taken from an FM broadcast.
 Tracks 6-10 recorded at MTV Studiosin New York City on January 10, 1992. "On a Plain" and "Stain" were played during soundcheck, while the rest of the songs were performed live but not broadcast.
 Tracks 11-19 recorded for Out of Order on KAOS radio at The Evergreen State College, Olympia, Washington in April 1987 with Aaron Burckhard on drums.  "White Lace and Strange" and "Anorexorcist" later appeared on With the Lights Out.
 Track 20 from an audience source recorded live at the Reading Festival in England on August 30, 1992, and later appeared in soundboard form on Live at Reading.
 Track 21 from a TV report recorded live at Terminal 1, Flughafen München-Riem in Munich, Germany, on March 1, 1994, and would be the band's last show.
 Track 22 "You Know You're Right", wrongly transcribed as "Autopilot" by David Frickie, from an audience source recorded live at the Aragon Ballroom in Chicago on October 23, 1993.

A Season in Hell Part One

A Season in Hell Part One is a bootleg CD box set manufactured in Italy and released by Banzai in 1994.  The collection is housed in a matte finish, square box that also includes a 7-inch×7″ booklet with 24 pages of photographs and information on the recordings featured in the set.  Spanning the three disc, 66-track collection are two shows from 1990, several demos, some rare live material, various b-sides and compilation tracks.  This is one of only two bootleg CD releases to feature the Off Ramp Café performance, and the only to feature the Town Pump show.  A portion of the box set would later be officially released on With the Lights Out.  In 1996, the inferior A Season In Hell Part Two was released by Razor's Edge, containing the 1994 Le Zénith show and an array of miscellaneous material, most of which was lifted from the Outcesticide series and official releases.

A Season in Hell Part One, CD 1

All songs written by Kurt Cobain except where noted.

 All tracks from an incomplete audience source recorded live at the Off Ramp Café in Seattle on November 25, 1990, and would be the ninth ever performance to feature Dave Grohl on drums. Missing the encore.

A Season in Hell Part One, CD 2

All songs written by Kurt Cobain except where noted.

 Tracks 1-13 from a near complete audience source recorded live at the Town Pump, Vancouver, British Columbia, on March 12, 1990, just two months prior to the departure of drummer Chad Channing.
 Tracks 14 and 15 recorded on a 4-track at the Cobain residence, Olympia, Washington in 1988.  "Beans" later appeared on With the Lights Out.
 Tracks 18-20 recorded summer 1988 at Reciprocal Recording, Seattle, Washington, with songs that appeared on the "Love Buzz" single.
 Track 21 recorded in 1989, released later in a Kiss Tribute Album  Hard to Believe: A Kiss Covers Compilation
 Tracks 22-24 recorded at The Music Source in Seattle in September 1989.  "Been a Son" and "Stain" appeared on the Blew EP.  "Even in His Youth" later appeared on With the Lights Out.

A Season in Hell Part One, CD 3

All songs written by Kurt Cobain except where noted.

 Track 1 recorded at The Music Source in Seattle in September 1989 and later appeared on With the Lights Out.
 Track 2 from a soundboard source recorded live at V4 in Vienna, Austria on November 22, 1989.
 Tracks 3, 12 and 13 from BBC radio sessions recorded at Maida Vale Studios in London in 1989 and 1991. "Been a Son" appeared on Incesticide.
 Tracks 4-6 from a soundboard source recorded live at the Pine Street Theatre in Portland, Oregon, on February 9, 1990. The complete show would later be released as a bonus to the reissue of Bleach in 2009.
 Track 10 from an audience source recorded live at Bloom in Mezzago, Italy, on November 17, 1991.
 Track 11 recorded for Top of the Pops at BBC Elstree Centre in Hertfordshire, England, on November 28, 1991, and appeared on Live! Tonight! Sold Out!!.
 Tracks 14 and 15 recorded for Saturday Night Live at NBC Studios in New York City on January 11, 1992.
 Track 23 appeared as a bonus on non-US pressings of In Utero.
 The third disc of this collection is the least significant since the majority of the tracks are taken from b-sides of singles and compilation appearances.  The release of With the Lights Out further denotes the importance of this disc, though it does still contain some unreleased material and even had some stolen by Blue Moon Records for its Outcesticide series.

Into the Black

Into the Black is a six CD box set released by Tribute in 1994, which is often considered the preferred Nirvana bootleg box set due to it being compiled by a knowledgeable fan.  It is housed in a glossy box, including a 22-page booklet made of thick cardstock.  Several recordings were obtained specifically for the set and it contains a large amount of material that had not yet surfaced up to the time of its release.  The extensive 116-track collection includes demo recordings, two band-made compilations, the 1992 Reading Festival performance and BBC radio sessions from Maida Vale Studios.  The set also contains two Seattle shows; the 1991 Halloween homecoming performance for their North American Nevermind tour, and their last ever American show in 1994.  Following Into the Black, Tribute released the 2-CD companion piece, New Year's Eve, featuring Nirvana's 1993 performance at the Oakland Coliseum as well as the 1988 Sub Pop 200 record release show in Seattle.

Ultra Rare Demos & Sessions

All songs written by Kurt Cobain except where noted.

 Tracks 1-7 and 9 recorded at Reciprocal Recording in Seattle on January 23, 1988.  "Spank Thru" remains unreleased.
 Tracks 10-12 recorded at Smart Studios in Madison, Wisconsin, in April 1990 and are sourced from the 7-inch vinyl bootleg Total Fucking Godhead. "Sappy" and "Polly" can be found on Master Demo Recordings in better quality.
 Tracks 14 and 15 recorded for Nozems-a-Gogo on VPRO radio at Villa 65, Hilversum, Netherlands, on November 1, 1989.
 Track 16 recorded for Boy Meets Girl on KAOS radio at The Evergreen State College in Olympia, Washington, on September 25, 1990, and later appeared without the interview on With the Lights Out.
 Tracks 17-20 from the BBC radio session recorded at Maida Vale Studios in London on November 9, 1991, sourced from the 7-inch vinyl bootleg Smells Like Nirvana.
 Tracks 21-23 recorded live at MTV Studiosin New York City on January 10, 1992.

Master Demo Recordings

All songs written by Kurt Cobain except where noted.

 Tracks 1-12 from a band made compilation of songs from two Reciprocal Recording sessions on January 23, 1988, and summer 1988, with the exception of "Escalator to Hell" which was recorded on a 4-track at the Cobain residence in 1988.  "Escalator to Hell", "Mr. Moustache", "Spank Thru" and "Sifting" remain unreleased.
 Tracks 13-19 recorded at Smart Studios in Madison, Wisconsin, in April 1990. They were taken from a cassette Nirvana was sending to record labels in 1990 after the original intention for release as the second Sub Pop album was scrapped.

Paramount Theatre

All songs written by Kurt Cobain except where noted.

 All tracks from a near complete soundboard source recorded live on October 31, 1991, at the Paramount Theatre in Seattle.  "Jesus Doesn't Want Me for a Sunbeam" was later featured on the DVD portion of With the Lights Out.  "Drain You" and "School" were issued as b-sides to the "Come As You Are" single.  "About a Girl", "Polly", "Breed" and portions of "Endless, Nameless" later appeared on Live! Tonight! Sold Out!!.  "Been a Son" was issued as a b-side to the "Lithium" single.  "Negative Creep" was later included on From the Muddy Banks of the Wishkah.  Several songs from this performance were also featured on Nevermind It's an Interview. Live at the Paramount, the official blu-ray release of the complete show, rendered this disc obsolete in 2011.

Reading Festival

All songs written by Kurt Cobain except where noted.

 Tracks 1-16 from an incomplete soundboard source recorded August 30, 1992, at the Reading Festival in England taken from the second FM broadcast.  Although many bootleg CDs feature this performance, they have become somewhat obsolete since the release of Live at Reading.  However, most bootleg CD releases maintain better continuity as compared to the official release CD version, which despite maintaining a more complete set list, was heavily edited due to time restraints.
 Tracks 17 and 18 recorded for Saturday Night Live at NBC Studios in New York City on January 11, 1992.

Last American Show Part 1

All songs written by Kurt Cobain except where noted.

 All tracks from a complete audience source recorded live at the Seattle Center Arena in Seattle on January 8, 1994, with the six final tracks of the performance featured on Last American Show Part 2.

Last American Show Part 2

All songs written by Kurt Cobain except where noted.

 Tracks 1-6 from a complete audience source recorded live at the Seattle Center Arena in Seattle on January 8, 1994, with the first nineteen tracks of the performance featured on Last American Show Part 1.
 Tracks 7-18 from BBC radio sessions recorded in 1989 and 1991 at Maida Vale Studios in London.  The disc is defective, which causes some of the tracks to not play properly.  The Complete Radio Sessions on Blue Moon Records and The Eternal Legacy released by Kiss the Stone both contain error free versions of these sessions.  "Love Buzz", "About a Girl", "Polly", and "Spank Thru" remain unreleased.
 Track 19 is Courtney Love's complete eulogy for Kurt Cobain recorded at the Seattle Center Flag Pavilion on April 10, 1994.

The Chosen Rejects 

The Chosen Rejects is a bootleg CD box set put together by John W. Busher in Italy and released November 1, 2006. The set is enclosed in 4 standard jewel cases, each of which have a separate title and cover image. Each CD also came with a track listing on the inside of the cover. This 4 disc box set holds an 80-track collection that are of soundboard quality except for track 15 on disc one, which is a boombox demo, and tracks 4–5, 7, 13–15, 19-20 on disc 4, which were recorded by audience members. The first disc also features 7 Fecal Matter demos, from the album Illiteracy Will Prevail. The bootleg was originally for sale on Discogs, however a copy has not been put up for sale since 2012, and probably never will be again due to their crackdown on sales of bootlegs.

The Chosen Rejects, CD 1, Home Demos 

Tracks 2-8 are Fecal Matter demos, recorded in 1985. 
Track 9 is a 4-Track demo from 1987.
Tracks 10-12 are 4-Track demos recorded in 1988. 
Tracks 1 and 14 are 4-Track tape collages created in 1988 that contain random snippets of sounds and clips.
Track 13 is a 4-Track demo from 1992. 
Track 15 is from a band practice in 1987 and is a cover of a Cher song of the same name.

The Chosen Rejects, CD 2, Studio Sessions 

Track 1 is a demo recorded at Reciprocal Recording in Seattle on January 23, 1988.
Track 2 is a rough mix recorded at Reciprocal Recording on January 23, 1988.
Tracks 3-5 are demos recorded at Reciprocal Recording on June 11, 1988.
Track 6 is a rough mix of a demo recorded at Reciprocal Recording on August 20–28, 1989.
Track 7 is a rough mix of a demo recorded at the Music Source studios in Seattle on September 1989.
Tracks 8-10 are demos recorded at Smart Studios in Madison, Wisconsin, on April 2–6, 1990.The same song can be found on Master Demo Recordings from the Into the Black box set. 
Tracks 11 is a rough mix recorded at the Music Source studios in Seattle on January 1, 1991.
Tracks 12-16 are demos recorded at the Music Source studios in Seattle on January 1, 1991.
Tracks 17-19 are rough mixes of the versions that will appear on Nevermind.
Track 20-22 are demos recorded at the BMG Ariola studios, Rio de Janeiro on January 19, 1993. "Onwards Into Countless Battles" is a cover of the band Unleashed and is titled "Dave's meat song" in the booklet of the box set "With the lights out".

The Chosen Rejects, CD 3, Broadcasts 

Tracks 1-3 were performed in 1987 at KAOS FM radio. 
Track 4 was performed at VPRO FM on November 1, 1989. 
Tracks 5-8 were performed at BBC FM October 26, 1989. 
Track 9 was performed September 3, 1991, at the BBC. 
Track 10 was performed November 9, 1991. 
Tracks 11,12 were performed on November 25, 1991, at VPRO FM. 
Track 13 was performed on SNL on January 11, 1992. 
Track 14 and 15 was performed at MTV on January 10, 1992. 
Track 16 was also performed at MTV but on September 9, 1992. 
Track 17 was performed on SNL September 25, 1993. 
Tracks 18 and 19 were performed February 4, 1994, at the Canal. 
Tracks 20 and 21 were performed at the Tunnel on February 23, 1994. 
Track 22 was performed on SNL on January 11, 1992.

The Chosen Rejects, CD 4, Live Rarities 

Tracks 1-3 and 21 are from a soundboard source recorded live at Tacoma on March 19, 1988.
Track 4 is a The Smack cover from an audience source recorded live at Olympia on October 30, 1988.
Track 5 is from an audience source recorded live at Seattle on December 28, 1988.
Track 6 is from a soundboard source recorded live at Omaha on October 8, 1989.
Track 7 is from an audience source recorded live at Birmingham on October 23, 1990.
Tracks 8-11 are from a soundboard source recorded live at Seattle on November 2, 1990.
Track 12 is from a soundboard source recorded live at Rome on November 19, 1991.
Track 13 is from an audience source recorded live at Tempe on October 23, 1991.
Track 15 is from a soundboard source recorded live at Mezzago on November 17, 1991.
Tracks 16-17 are from a soundboard source recorded live at Roskilde on May 26, 1992.
Track 18 is from a soundboard source recorded live at Buenos Aires on October 30, 1992.
Track 19 is from an audience source recorded live at Chicago on October 23, 1993.
Track 20 is from an audience source recorded live at Seattle on January 8, 1994. (Nirvana's final U.S. show)

References

Bootleg recordings
Nirvana (band) live albums
1990s live albums